Rüstem Pasha Medrese  
is a medrese building, located in Kütahya, Turkey. It was rebuilt after the original building, which was built by Ottoman statesman and grand vizier Rüstem Pasha in 1550, was partly demolished in the 1930s.

References

External links

Buildings and structures in Kütahya
Buildings and structures completed in 1550
1550 establishments in the Ottoman Empire
Buildings and structures of the Ottoman Empire
Madrasas in Turkey
Rebuilt buildings and structures in Turkey